Lake Paracota (possibly from Aymara phara dry, quta lake) or Laguna Parinacota is a lake in Peru located in the Tacna Region, Candarave Province, Candarave District. Lake Paracota lies between the larger Lake Suches in the northwest and the volcano Tutupaca in the south.

References 

Lakes of Peru
Lakes of Tacna Region